Duncan William Ferguson Lamont (17 June 1918 – 19 December 1978) was a British actor. Born in Lisbon, Portugal, and brought up in Scotland, he had a long and successful career in film and television, appearing in a variety of high-profile productions.

Career

He trained as an actor at RADA in London. He had a considerable amount of stage experience before World War II. He acted in repertory and at the Shakespeare Memorial Theatre, Stratford-upon-Avon. He entered films in the early 1950s.

On film, he appeared in The Adventures of Quentin Durward (1955, as the villain De La Marck), The 39 Steps (1959, as Kennedy), Ben-Hur (1959, as Marius, an associate of Messala), Mutiny on the Bounty (1962, as John Williams), Arabesque (1966, as Kyle Webster) and Battle of Britain (1969, as Flight Sergeant Arthur). Lamont is particularly memorable in his role as the wry, urbane Viceroy in Jean Renoir's The Golden Coach (1952).

From 1958 to 1960, Lamont was a semi-regular as David MacMorris in the CBS western television series, The Texan, starring Rory Calhoun.

Lamont also appeared in guest roles in a range of popular British programmes from the 1950s to the 1970s, including The Adventures of Robin Hood, Dixon of Dock Green, Danger Man, The Avengers, Secret Army, Randall and Hopkirk (Deceased), The Persuaders! and Doctor Who.

In 1953, he appeared in the major role of astronaut Victor Carroon in Nigel Kneale's ground-breaking BBC science-fiction serial The Quatermass Experiment, and fourteen years later returned to the series when he played the role of Sladden in the Hammer Films version of the third serial, Quatermass and the Pit.

He died in 1978 in Tunbridge Wells, Kent, of a heart attack at the age of 60. He was working at the time on "Hostage", an episode of the BBC science-fiction series Blake's 7. Although he had completed location work for the episode, he died before the studio scenes had been shot, necessitating a re-mount of the location material performed by his replacement John Abineri.

He was married to the Irish actress Patricia Driscoll until his death in 1978. They had two children together.

Filmography

 Waterfront (1950) - 3rd Engineer On Ship (uncredited)
 The Woman in Question (1950) - Barney (uncredited)
 She Shall Have Murder (1950) - Police Sergeant
 The Galloping Major (1951) - 2nd Trainer
 There Is Another Sun (1951) - Policeman (uncredited)
 The Man in the White Suit (1951) - Harry
 Song of Paris (1952) - Undetermined Role (uncredited)
 Emergency Call (1952) - Police Constable
 The Lost Hours (1952) - Bristow
 The Night Won't Talk (1952) - Sergeant Robbins
 The Golden Coach (1952) - Ferdinand, Le Viceroy
 The Final Test (1953) - Unpleasant Pub Customer (uncredited)
 The Intruder (1953) - Donald Cope
 The End of the Road (1953) - Barney
 Meet Mr. Malcolm (1954) - Superintendent Simmons
 Time Is My Enemy (1954) - Inspector Charles Wayne
 The Teckman Mystery (1954) - Insp. Hilton
 The Passing Stranger (1954) - Fred
 Burnt Evidence (1954) - Jack Taylor
 Passage Home (1955) - 1st Mate Llewllyn
 Strike (1955, TV film)
 The Adventures of Quentin Durward (1955) - Count William De La Marck
 The Baby and the Battleship (1956) - Master-at-Arms
 High Flight (1957) - Weapons Corporal
 A Tale of Two Cities (1958) - Ernest Defarge
 I Was Monty's Double (1958) - Wing Cdr. Bates
 The 39 Steps (1959) - Kennedy
 Ben-Hur (1959) - Marius (uncredited)
 A Touch of Larceny (1959) - 1st Special Branch man Gregson
 A Circle of Deception (1960) - Jules Burlard
 The Queen's Guards (1961) - Wilkes
 Sodom and Gomorrah (1962)
 Mutiny on the Bounty (1962) - John Williams
 Panic (1963) - Inspector Saunders
 Murder at the Gallop (1963) - Hillman
 The Scarlet Blade (1963) - Maj. Bell
 The Devil-Ship Pirates (1964) - The Bosun
 The Evil of Frankenstein (1964) - Chief of Police
 Coast of Skeletons (1964) - Charlie Singer (voice, uncredited)
 The Brigand of Kandahar (1965) - Colonel Drewe
 The Murder Game (1965) - Inspector Telford
 Arabesque (1966) - Webster
 The Witches (1966) - Bob Curd
 Frankenstein Created Woman (1967) - The Prisoner
 Quatermass and the Pit (1967) - Sladden
 The Strange Case of Dr. Jekyll and Mr. Hyde (1968, TV Movie) - Sergeant Grimes
 Decline and Fall... of a Birdwatcher (1968) - Inspector Bruce
 Battle of Britain (1969) - Flight Sgt. Arthur
 Burke & Hare (1971) - Dr. Saint
 Pope Joan (1972) - 1st Wounded Soldier
 Nothing But the Night (1973) - Dr. Knight
 The Creeping Flesh (1973) - Inspector
 Doctor Who (1974) - Death to the Daleks - Dan Galloway 
 Poldark (1975) - Bartholomew Tregirls
 Escape from the Dark (1976)
 Robin's Nest (1976) - Mr MacGregor

References

External links

Scottish male film actors
Scottish male television actors
1918 births
1978 deaths
People from Lisbon
20th-century Scottish male actors